Putot-en-Auge (literally Putot in Auge) is a commune in the Calvados department in the Normandy region in northwestern France.

On the hill to the east of Putot a vicious battle was fought on August 19, 1944. The Allied casualties lie in the small churchyard of Putot-en-Auge.

The village features heavily in the book "13 - Lucky For Some" which is about the history of the 13th (Lancashire) Parachute Battalion. There are many then and now photographs as well as maps and diagrams of battles that took place in the region.

Population

See also
Communes of the Calvados department

References

Communes of Calvados (department)
Calvados communes articles needing translation from French Wikipedia